The 1939 Virginia Cavaliers football team represented the University of Virginia during the 1939 college football season. The Cavaliers were led by third-year head coach Frank Murray and played their home games at Scott Stadium in Charlottesville, Virginia. They competed as independents, finishing with a record of 5–4.

Schedule

References

Virginia
Virginia Cavaliers football seasons
Virginia Cavaliers football